Paulo Vítor Barbosa de Carvalho (born June 7, 1957 in Belém), best known as Paulo Vítor, is a former Brazilian football (soccer) goalkeeper.

During his career (1974–1994) he played for CEUB, Operário de Várzea Grande, Brasília, Vila Nova-GO, Vitória-ES, Fluminense, América-RJ, Coritiba, Sport Recife, São José, Grêmio de Maringá, Remo Pará, Paysandu and Volta Redonda. He won two Campeonato Brasileiro in 1978 and 1984, three consecutive Rio de Janeiro State Championship (1983, 1984, 1985) and one Mato Grosso State Tournament in 1977.

For the Brazil national football team he played in nine matches, June 1984 to April 1986, and was on the roster for the 1986 FIFA World Cup as a reserve.

References

1957 births
Living people
Brazilian footballers
Association football goalkeepers
Campeonato Brasileiro Série A players
Vila Nova Futebol Clube players
Vitória Futebol Clube (ES) players
Fluminense FC players
America Football Club (RJ) players
Coritiba Foot Ball Club players
Sport Club do Recife players
São José Esporte Clube players
Clube do Remo players
Paysandu Sport Club players
Volta Redonda FC players
1986 FIFA World Cup players
Brazil international footballers
CE Operário Várzea-Grandense players
Sportspeople from Belém